"Hot Mama" is  a song written by Tom Shapiro and Casey Beathard, and recorded by American country music singer Trace Adkins.  It was released in September 2003 as the lead single from his album Comin' On Strong.  The song peaked at number 5 on the U.S. Billboard Hot Country Singles & Tracks (now Hot Country Songs) chart, giving Adkins his seventh Top 10 single on that chart. It also peaked at number 51 on the U.S. Billboard Hot 100.

Content
In "Hot Mama," the male narrator addresses his lover, telling her that he enjoys her body the way that it is.

The song can be heard in the King of the Hill episode, "The Redneck on Rainey Street", in which Adkins voices the character Elvin Mackelston.

Critical reception
Deborah Evans Price, of Billboard magazine reviewed the song favorably, calling a "thumpin' ode to appreciation of one's good ole gal, particularly when sleeping kids provide opportunity." She goes on to say that Adkins "wraps his muscular baritone around a bold production and a lyric heavy on domestic-life testosterone." William Ruhlmann of Allmusic also gave the song a favorable review, saying that it "has a frisky appeal and, with its erotically charged tag line, 'You wanna?' a novelty quality[.]"

Music video
The music video was directed by Michael Salomon, and premiered in late 2003. It co-stars model Lisa Ligon.

Chart performance
"Hot Mama" debuted at number 53 on the U.S. Billboard Hot Country Songs for the week of September 27, 2003.

Year-end charts

See also 

 Physical attractiveness
MILF

References

2003 singles
Trace Adkins songs
Songs written by Tom Shapiro
Songs written by Casey Beathard
Song recordings produced by Scott Hendricks
Capitol Records Nashville singles
Music videos directed by Michael Salomon
2003 songs